Sialkot Hockey Stadium is a field hockey stadium in Sialkot, Punjab, Pakistan. It has an AstroTurf surface. Necessary arrangements are being finalised for development work on the Sialkot Hockey Stadium which will cost Rs 1002 million. A pavilion, dressing rooms and stands for spectators will be constructed. It is located at Pasrur Road, Sialkot near Gulsahan-i-Iqbal Park.

It hosted its first international match between Indian Junior Hockey Team and Pakistan Junior Hockey Team on 18 November 2008.

References 

Tourist attractions in Sialkot
Field hockey venues in Pakistan
Sports venues in Pakistan
Buildings and structures in Sialkot
Sport in Sialkot